Tshekedi Stanford Khama (born 9 June 1958) is a Botswana politician. He is currently Member of Parliament for Serowe West, representing the Botswana Patriotic Front.

Biography
Khama is one of four children of the first President of Botswana, Seretse Khama and Ruth Williams Khama, and is the brother of former president Ian Khama.

Political career
Khama was elected to the National Assembly in Serowe North West in a 2008 by-election as a Botswana Democratic Party (BDP)  member. He was subsequently re-elected in 2009 and 2014. From 2012 until 2018 he was Minister of Environment, Conservation, Natural Resources and Tourism. In 2018, President Mokgweetsi Masisi made him Minister of Youth Empowerment, Sports and Culture Development.

Prior to the 2019 general elections, he left the BDP to join the new Botswana Patriotic Front (BPF), and was one of three BPF candidates elected.

References

Members of the National Assembly (Botswana)
Living people
Botswana Democratic Party politicians
1958 births
Botswana people of English descent
People from Serowe
Culture ministers of Botswana
Environment ministers of Botswana
Sports ministers of Botswana
Tourism ministers of Botswana
Youth ministers of Botswana